Lot 3 is a township in Prince County, Prince Edward Island, Canada created during the 1764–1766 survey of Samuel Holland.  It is part of North Parish.

Population
899 (2006 census)
864 (2001 census)
893 (1996 census)

Communities

Incorporated municipalities:

 Greenmount-Montrose

Civic address communities:

 Alma
 Central Kildare
 Elmsdale
 Greenmount
 Huntley
 Kildare Capes
 Lauretta
 Montrose
 Roseville
 St. Edward
 St. Lawrence
 Woodvale

History

The township went through various owners under feudalism when Prince Edward Island was a British colony prior to Canadian Confederation:

 Chauncy Townsend, Esq. (M.P.). (1767-1810)
   Various. (1838)
 Benj. Bowring, Esq., Jas. Yeo, Esq., and others. (1864)

03
Geography of Prince County, Prince Edward Island